Divinefire is a  Christian metal group founded in the spring of  2004 by Finnish guitarist Jani Stefanovic, and Swedish singer Christian Liljegren.  Liljegren is the current frontman of the band Narnia.

The group signed a contract with King Records, in Japan and proceeded to release their first album, Glory Thy Name on December 18, 2004. One month later it was released in Western countries by Rivel Records, Christian Liljegren's label.

Their style mixes power metal with both melodic and aggressive elements.

They have also had many special guest musicians on their albums.  Among them have been Carl Johan Grimmark of Narnia and Eric Clayton of Saviour Machine.

Members 
Current members
Jani Stefanovic – drums, guitar, keyboard
Christian Liljegren – vocals
Germán Pascual – vocals

Former
 Torbjörn Weinesjö – guitar
 Andreas Olsson – bass, backing vocals

Guest musicians
 Pontus Norgren
 Thomas Vikström
 Maria Rådsten
 Fredrik Sjöholm
 Carl Johan Grimmark
 Eric Clayton
 Hubertus Liljegren

Discography

Studio albums 
Glory Thy Name (2004)
Hero (2005)
Into a New Dimension (2006)
Farewell (2008)
Eye of the Storm (2011)

Notes and references

External links

Divinefire at MySpace
Rivel Records

Musical groups established in 2004
Swedish power metal musical groups
Swedish symphonic metal musical groups
Century Media Records artists
Finnish musical trios
Swedish Christian metal musical groups